The Filipino singer Yasmien Kurdi has released two studio albums: In the Name of Love (2006) and Love Is All I Need (2007), as well as various singles and music videos.

Albums

Singles

Compilation and soundtrack appearances

Music videos

References 

Discographies of Filipino artists